A dribble glass is a drinking glass that has holes hidden in its etched design.

The purpose of a dribble glass is for pranks. When a person tilts the glass to take a drink from this glass, they will end up spilling the liquid on their clothing as the drink trickles through the holes.

In Ancient Greece, sculptors created vases that featured a small rectangular hole in the foot of the vase. These so-called "dirty trick vases" are the earliest known example of the dribble glass.

See also
Fuddling cup
 List of practical joke topics
Puzzle jug
Pythagorean cup

References

Further reading
 

Practical joke devices
Drinkware